English is an unincorporated community in McDowell County, West Virginia, United States. Its post office was closed on November 9, 2002. It was the seat of its county until 1892, when it was moved to Welch.
The town is on the Norfolk Southern Railway (former Norfolk and Western) network and also the Tug Fork river.

References

Unincorporated communities in McDowell County, West Virginia
Unincorporated communities in West Virginia
Coal towns in West Virginia
Former county seats in West Virginia